The Roe III Triplane was an early aircraft designed by the British aircraft manufacturer Avro. In configuration, it was similar to the Roe II Triplane, with a triplane tailplane and an open-top fuselage of triangular cross-section, but the Roe III was a two-seater, and featured ailerons for the first time in a Roe design. The five (some sources give three) production machines differed from the prototype in having the ailerons fitted to the middle wing (the prototype's were on the upper wing) and in being powered by a Green engine in place of the prototype's JAP.

One example was sold to the Harvard Aeronautical Society, one was exported to the United States, and two others suffered a curious fate while en route to the 1910 Blackpool Meeting - sparks from the steam locomotive taking them to Blackpool set fire to the aircraft. Roe was able to quickly replace them with new aircraft built from spare parts.

Specifications

See also

References

 
 
 

1910s British experimental aircraft
Roe III Triplane
Triplanes
Single-engined tractor aircraft
Aircraft first flown in 1910